Pachypodium gracilius is a species of Pachypodium endemic to Madagascar. The plant trunk is pachycaul, and typically short and fat.  It produces yellow flowers.

Synonymy
Recent revision of this taxon consider it as a subspecies of Pachypodium rosulatum:
Pachypodium rosulatum subsp. gracilius

gracilius
Endemic flora of Madagascar
Caudiciform plants